Ernesto de Figueiredo Cordeiro (born 6 July 1937) is a Portuguese retired footballer who played as a striker.

Club career
Born in Tomar, Santarém District, Figueiredo arrived at Sporting CP in the summer of 1960 from amateurs União Desportiva e Recreativa de Cernache, aged already 23. He scored 17 goals in only 24 games in his first season with his new team, good enough for Primeira Liga runner-up accolades.

At the end of the 1965–66 campaign, Figueiredo finished joint-top scorer alongside S.L. Benfica's Eusébio – both at 25 goals – but his team won the league by one point. During his time at the Estádio José Alvalade, he netted 147 times in 232 competitive appearances; additionally, in the 1963–64 edition of the UEFA Cup Winners' Cup, he featured in the final against MTK Budapest FC, won after a replay and with the player scoring twice in the first match (3–3 draw).

Nicknamed Altafini of Cernache during his spell at the Estádio José Alvalade, Figueiredo retired in 1970 after two years with Vitória de Setúbal also in the top division, aged 33.

International career
Figueiredo earned six caps for Portugal, making his debut on 21 June 1966 in a friendly match with Denmark. He was selected by manager Otto Glória for his 1966 FIFA World Cup squad, being an unused member for the third-placed team.

Honours

Club
Sporting
Primeira Liga: 1961–62, 1965–66
UEFA Cup Winners' Cup: 1963–64

International
Portugal
FIFA World Cup third place: 1966

References

External links

1937 births
Living people
People from Tomar
Portuguese footballers
Association football forwards
Primeira Liga players
U.F.C.I. Tomar players
Sporting CP footballers
Vitória F.C. players
Portugal international footballers
1966 FIFA World Cup players
Sportspeople from Santarém District